Villgro, formerly known as Rural Innovations Network, is a social enterprise incubator. Villgro funds, mentors and incubates early-stage, innovation-based social enterprises that impact the lives of India’s poor. Since 2001, Villgro has incubated 119 such enterprises, which have secured Rs 1195 million in follow-on funding, and touched over 15 million lives.

References
 Varsha Rain Gun, an innovation incubated by Villgro 
 Villgro Awards (formerly L-RAMP Awards) 
 Interview with Paul Basil, founder of Villgro

External links
 Official website

Mutual organizations